Light & Magic is a 2022 documentary TV series directed by Lawrence Kasdan and produced by Lucasfilm Ltd. and Imagine Documentaries. The series debuted as a Disney+ Original on July 27, 2022, with all six episodes airing at once.

Premise 
The series recounts the history of the motion picture visual effects company Industrial Light & Magic (ILM) from its founding in 1975 to its key role in the development of visual effects in filmmaking.

Episodes

Release 
The series premiered on Disney+ on July 27, 2022.

Reception

Critical response 
Review aggregator Rotten Tomatoes reported an approval rating of 100% based on 13 reviews, with an average rating of 8.8/10. The website's critics consensus reads, "Documenting the rise of ILM with comprehensive attention to detail, Light & Magic is a worthy salute to the elbow grease that goes into moviemaking and an absolute treat for fans of cinematic wizardry."

Brian Lowry of CNN stated Lawrence Kasdan manages to depict a thoughtful, entertaining, and detailed look at the creation of special effects across the documentary series, and found it to be an ambitious and deep take on how ILM's special effects can make an impact. Jim Hemphill of IndieWire found that Kasdan succeeds to narrate a broad story dealing with advanced technologies across a personal lens, saying the documentary follows the evolution of Lucasfilm Ltd and its employees in a moving, entertaining, and profound manner.

Stephanie Morgan of Common Sense Media rated the documentary 4 out of 5 stars, applauded the educational value, calling the behind-the-scenes fascinating, and praised the depiction of positive messages and role models, citing ingenuity, perseverance, and teamwork, while taking note of the diverse representations. Tara Bennett of IGN rated the series 7 out of 10, called George Lucas' creation of Lucasfilm Ltd a compelling story, and stated the company succeeds to depict its impact on the movie industry across Light & Magic, but found the series too condensed, saying the documentary is too short to unfold Lucasfilm Ltd's full story.

References

External links 
 

2022 American television series debuts
2020s American documentary television series
Disney+ original programming
Documentary television series about art
Documentary television series about technology
Documentary television series about industry
English-language television shows
Television series about filmmaking
Television series by Lucasfilm
Television series by Imagine Entertainment